Death and the Maiden, a concept ultimately derived from the Medieval "Dance of Death",  may refer to:

Drama
Death and the Maiden (play), by Ariel Dorfman
Death and the Maiden (film), an adaptation by Roman Polanski
Prinzessinnendramen: Der Tod und das Mädchen I-V (Princess Dramas: Death and the Maiden I-V), five theatrical plays by Elfriede Jelinek

Literature
 Death and the Maidens, a biography of Fanny Imlay
 Death and the Maiden (novel), a 1947 novel by Gladys Mitchell
 "Death and the Maiden", a 1960 short story by Ray Bradbury
 Death and the Maiden, a 1994 novel by P. N. Elrod
 Batman: Death and the Maidens, a graphic novel by Greg Rucka
 Death and the Maiden, a 1939 mystery novel by Q. Patrick

Music
 "Death and the Maiden" (song), composed by Franz Schubert in 1817
 Death and the Maiden Quartet, an 1824 string quartet by Franz Schubert
 Death and the Maiden Ballet, a 1938 ballet by Nikos Skalkottas
 "Death and the Maiden" (The Verlaines song)
 "Death and the Maiden Retold", a song by The Imagined Village from their self-titled debut album

Television
"Death and the Maiden" (The Vampire Diaries), an episode of the television series The Vampire Diaries

Visual arts
 Death and the Maiden (motif), a common motif in Renaissance art
 Death and the Maiden (Baldung), a 1517 painting by German artist Hans Baldung 
 Death and the Maiden (Schiele), a 1915 painting by Egon Schiele
 Death and the Maiden, a sketch by Edvard Munch
 Death and the Maiden, a painting by Pierre Puvis de Chavannes
 Death and the Maiden, a 1908 painting by Marianne Stokes

See also
 Egon Schiele: Death and the Maiden, a 2016 Austrian film